Fritz von Scholz (9 December 1896 – 28 July 1944) was a high-ranking member of the Waffen-SS during World War II and a recipient of the Knight's Cross of the Iron Cross with Oak Leaves and Swords of Nazi Germany.

Career
Born in 1896, Fritz von Scholz served in World War I with the Austro-Hungarian Army in 1914. Discharged from the army in 1919, Scholz was a member of the paramilitary Freikorps since 1921. He joined the Austrian branch of the Nazi Party (NSDAP) in 1932 (Nr. 1304071), and then the Austrian SA. Following his involvement in street violence, Scholz fled to Nazi Germany in late 1933 to avoid arrest. He joined the SS in 1937 (Nr. 135638), serving with the Austrian SS Legion.

Scholtz started World War II as a battalion commander in the SS-Regiment Der Führer, taking part in the Western campaign of 1940 and later taking command of the SS Regiment Nordland, which in 1941 became part of a new SS Division Wiking. Attached to Army Group South, the division took Tarnopol in Galicia in late June, 1941. In early 1943, he took command of first 1 SS Infantry Brigade, attached to Army Group Centre, then 2 SS Infantry Brigade composed of mostly Latvian recruits, under Army Group North. On 20 April, Scholz was appointed commander of a new SS Division Nordland. The division was soon moved to Croatia where it saw action against Yugoslav partisans.

In January 1944, the division was transferred to the Oranienbaum front near Leningrad and attached to the III SS Panzer Corps under Army Group North. The division retreated to Narva and participated in the battles for the Narva bridgehead.

Scholz was awarded the Oakleaves to the Knight's Cross on 12 March 1944. In late July, after the launch of the Soviet Narva Offensive, the Corps retreated from the city of Narva and the Narva river in general, to the Tannenberg defences at the Sinimäed Hills. On 27 July 1944, Scholz was wounded in an artillery barrage and died the next day. He was posthumously awarded the Swords to the Knight's Cross on 8 August 1944.

Awards 
Iron Cross 2nd Class (17 May 1940) & 1st Class
German Cross in Gold on 22 November 1941 as SS-Standartenführer in SS-Regiment "Nordland"
Knight's Cross of the Iron Cross with Oak Leaves and Swords
Knight's Cross on 18 January 1942 as SS-Oberführer and commander of SS-Regiment "Nordland"
423rd Oak Leaves on 12 March 1944 as SS-Brigadeführer of the Waffen-SS and commander of the 11. SS-Freiwilligen-Panzergrenadier-Division "Nordland"
85th Swords on 8 August 1944 (posthumously) as SS-Gruppenführer of the Waffen-SS and commander of the 11. SS-Panzergrenadier-Division "Nordland"

See also
List SS-Gruppenführer

References

Citations

Bibliography

 
 
 

1896 births
1944 deaths
People from Plzeň
German Bohemian people
SS-Gruppenführer
20th-century Freikorps personnel
Recipients of the Gold German Cross
Recipients of the Knight's Cross of the Iron Cross with Oak Leaves and Swords
Austro-Hungarian military personnel of World War I
Austrian military personnel killed in World War II
Edlers of Austria
Austro-Hungarian Army officers
Waffen-SS personnel killed in action